The share of agriculture in Austria in the Austrian economy declined steadily after World War II, agriculture continues to represent an important element of the economy because of its social and political significance. The Chamber of Agriculture remains on an equal level with the chambers of commerce and labor, although its members produce only a fraction of the GDP that industrial and commercial workers produce.

Production

Austria produced in 2018:

 2.3 million tons of sugar beet (the beet is used to manufacture sugar and ethanol);
 2.1 million tons of maize;
 1.3 million tons of wheat;
 697 thousand tons of potato;
 695 thousand tons of barley;
 387 thousand tons of apple;
 367 thousand tons of grape;
 278 thousand tons of triticale;
 184 thousand tons of soybean;
 177 thousand tons of rye (12th largest world producer);
 132 thousand tons of onion;
 120 thousand tons of rapeseed;
 111 thousand tons of pear;

In addition to smaller productions of other agricultural products.

Government role
In Austria, as in most other eastern countries, the government has played an important role in agriculture since the end of War World II. The government has concentrated on mitigating social, regional, economic, and even environmental consequences of the sector's decline, as well as delaying the decline itself.

Agricultural policy has been carried out with different objectives and with different laws and policies depending on the times. at the early post-war years, the most important objectives were survival and self-sufficiency. As a poor country, Austria needed to be able to feed itself if its population was to survive.

By the 1950s, however, the policy was changing to a more global perspective, while keeping intact the traditional farm economy. The government wanted to protect domestic production, stabilize agricultural markets, protect farmers' incomes, and improve the sector's ability to compete in Austria and abroad. Increasingly, the government began to believe in the importance of maintaining rural society as an objective in its own right, for social reasons, and to protect the environment and encourage tourism. Because of these aims, agricultural policy, more than any other economic policy, reflects a mixture of economic and noneconomic objectives and concerns. The principal aim, however, is to preserve the existing number of farms as much as possible.

Within the structure of the social partnership, various organizations work to maintain farm incomes and thus farm existence, among them the Grain Board, the Dairy Board, and the Livestock and Meat Commission. These organizations set basic support prices, taking into account domestic costs and local supply and demand, with only weak linkages to world market prices.

The boards and commission use a variety of measures to achieve their broad purposes. Among these measures are import restrictions, such as border controls and entry controls—some of which may be bilaterally negotiated—and variable import duties. If import restrictions are not sufficient to maintain prices because of excess production, the surplus is exported at subsidized prices (with the subsidies usually coming from federal or provincial authorities). Authorities also apply production controls, such as sales quotas or limits, on the size and density of livestock holdings. Quotas exist for many different products, with the quotas usually fixed on the basis of past production. Price and quality controls and limits also exist, especially with respect to different prices for different grades of wheat or milk. The government can also pay direct income supplements, but these payments are generally restricted to certain mountain farming zones and other equally disadvantaged areas. Subsidies are mainly paid by the federal government but may in some instances be paid by provincial governments.

Because of the complex system of price supports and market access limitations, the exact share of subsidy costs to the government and to consumers is virtually impossible to calculate. Experts estimate that the total cost to the federal and other governments for agricultural and forestry support during the late 1980s was approximately S16 billion a year, a level that would have been roughly at the same level as that of many other Organisation for Economic Co-operation and Development (OECD) governments but slightly higher than the EC average.

The economic research institute Österreichisches Institut für Wirtschaftsforschung (WIFO) estimated after a major 1989 study that about 71 percent of the cost of agricultural support was borne by consumers in the form of higher prices, with the taxpayers carrying the remaining 29 percent through such different programs as direct and indirect federal and provincial subsidies or various kinds of market regulation.

Structure of agriculture
Despite the government's efforts to sustain agriculture, not one province had as much as 10 percent of the population involved in agriculture and forestry by 1991. At the beginning of the 1970s, all but two provinces (Vienna and Vorarlberg) had more than 10 percent of their populations involved in farming. This contrasted markedly to the situation in 1934, when all but those same two provinces had more than 30 percent of their populations working in agriculture. Over this period of two generations, the decline in the Austrian farm population was as fast as any in the Western world.

As of the early 1990s, of Austria's total area of almost 84,000 square kilometers, about 67,000 square kilometers was used for farming and forestry. Roughly half of that area was forest, and the remainder was arable land and pasture.

Agriculture and forestry accounted for about 280,000 enterprises in 1986, with the average holding being about twenty-three hectares. There were about 4,500 corporate farms. Beyond those farms, however, only a third of all farmers were full-time farmers or farming companies. Over half the farming enterprises were smaller than ten hectares; nearly 40 percent were smaller than five hectares. Just as the number of farmers has long been in decline, so also has been the number of farms.

Family labor predominates, especially in mountainous areas and on smaller farms. Only a third of all farm and forestry enterprises were classified as full-time occupations in 1986. A full half of these enterprises are spare-time, that is, less than half of household labor is devoted to farming or forestry. The remainder are part-time. Farms up to ten hectares are more often tended by part-time and spare-time farmers rather than by full-time farmers. For most farm owners and workers, nonfarm income is as important, if not more important, than farm income.

Despite the decline in the number of farmers and agriculture's share of GDP since 1960, agricultural output has risen. As of the early 1990s, Austria was self-sufficient in all cereals and milk products as well as in red meat. This gain was achieved because of the considerable gains in agricultural labor productivity.

The value of agricultural and forestry output is heavily concentrated in field crops, meat, and dairy products, with most of it coming from animal husbandry. Because large parts of Austria are mountainous, only the lowland areas of eastern Austria and some smaller flat portions of western and northern Austria are suitable for crop production and more intensive forms of animal husbandry. The remainder of the land is used for forestry and less intensive animal husbandry, most of which takes advantage of mountain pasturage.

References